Sammis Daniel Reyes Martel (born October 19, 1995) is a Chilean gridiron football tight end who is a free agent. He was the first player from Chile to play in the NFL. Reyes grew up playing basketball as a youth member of the Chile national team before moving to the United States on an athletic scholarship at 14. He played college basketball at Hawaii, Palm Beach State, Tulane, and Loyola–New Orleans, graduating with a Master of Business Administration degree with the latter. 

Despite being a student in the United States, Reyes continued to play with the Chile national team before deciding to switch to football after failing to qualify for the 2019 FIBA Basketball World Cup. He was accepted into the NFL's International Player Pathway Program (IPPP) and signed with the Washington Football Team after impressing scouts at a demonstration event in 2021. Reyes made a few game appearances with Washington on special teams that season before being released the following year due to injuries.

Career

Basketball
Sammis Daniel Reyes Martel was born on October 19, 1995, in Talcahuano, a port city in the Greater Concepción metropolitan area of Chile. His family moved to Santiago shortly after, where Reyes grew up playing soccer and basketball with aspirations to play in the NBA. At the age of nine he joined the Boston College Sports Club, a member of the Liga Nacional de Básquetbol de Chile, prior to being recruited to join the Chile national basketball team two years later. He was a member of the Boston College team that were runners-up of the 2014 Campioni del Domani, a basketball tournament in Chile for players aged 19 and under.

While on a US tour with the Chilean youth national team in 2010, Reyes was scouted by American recruiters and offered a scholarship to attend Westlake Prep, a school in the Miami metropolitan area. He accepted and left Chile by himself at age 14 to attend the following year. He arrived knowing almost no English and had to quickly learn it, which he did through exposure from film and music. During this time he met and befriended Alex Rifkind, the son of music entrepreneur Steve Rifkind, while playing together in an Amateur Athletic Union basketball circuit. Reyes eventually moved in with the Rifkinds and transferred to North Broward Preparatory School in Coconut Creek, Florida, after briefly attending Saint Andrews School in Boca Raton due to Westlake Prep shutting down.

Reyes signed a National Letter of Intent to play college basketball at the University of Hawaii in 2014, but suffered a hand injury while practicing with them that forced him to miss his freshman season. Later feeling homesick and disapproving with the school's decision to fire head coach Gib Arnold mid-season, he dropped out and returned to Florida to recover from his injuries. Reyes then attended a semester at Palm Beach State College and played with their basketball team before transferring to Tulane University in 2016. He spent two seasons with the Tulane Green Wave but played in just two games in 2017 after opting-out due to being unhappy with his playing time. 

Reyes graduated from Tulane's Freeman School of Business with a degree in business management before playing his final year of collegiate eligibility for the Loyola Wolf Pack at Loyola University New Orleans in 2018, where he also graduated with a Master of Business Administration degree. In addition to college basketball, he still participated with the Chile national team in international events such as the 2011 FIBA Americas Under-16 Championship and the 2019 FIBA Basketball World Cup qualifiers. He primarily played the power forward position throughout his basketball career.

American football

Reyes ended his basketball career after Chile failed to qualify for the 2019 FIBA World Cup and began working as an athletic trainer until social distancing regulations arising from the COVID-19 pandemic in 2020 prevented him from continuing. He then worked as a driver for DoorDash before deciding to become a professional American football player. Reyes had been advised by several teammates and coaches to play the sport since first arriving in the United States, with him only trying it out for a week in high school before stopping as he believed the higher risk of injury would hinder his chances at making an NBA roster.

Despite knowing nearly nothing about football, Reyes applied for and was accepted into the National Football League's (NFL) International Player Pathway Program (IPPP) as a tight end prospect. He spent 10 weeks training and learning the sport at IMG Academy in Bradenton before participating alongside other IPPP players at the University of Florida's Pro Day on March 31, 2021. He received interest from several NFL teams there due to his athletic performance before accepting a three-year contract from the Washington Football Team on April 13, 2021, citing his residency in the Washington metropolitan area and his fit with the team's culture. Reyes became the first Chilean-born player in the NFL upon the signing. He was also selected by the Toronto Argonauts in the fourth round (34th overall) of the 2021 CFL Global Draft.

Reyes made his professional debut against the New Orleans Saints in October 2021, where he played a limited number of snaps on special teams. He spent a week on the team's COVID-19 reserve list alongside several other players in December 2021. He finished the season playing in 11 games, primarily on special teams, where he recorded two tackles. During training camp for the 2022 season, Reyes suffered a hamstring injury and was placed on the injured reserve list before being released by the team with an injury settlement on August 23, 2022. On October 18, 2022, Reyes signed with the Chicago Bears' practice squad.

Personal life
Reyes appeared in a 2021 Chilean advertisement for Pepsi Zero.

References

External links

 
 Chicago Bears profile
 Tulane basketball profile
 RealGM profile
 FIBA profile

1995 births
American football tight ends
Basketball players from Florida
Chicago Bears players
Chile men's national basketball team players
Chilean men's basketball players
Chilean emigrants to the United States
Chilean expatriate sportspeople in the United States
Chilean expatriate basketball people in the United States
Expatriate players of American football
Freeman School of Business alumni
Hawaii Rainbow Warriors basketball players
International Player Pathway Program participants
Living people
Loyola Wolf Pack men's basketball players
Palm Beach State Panthers athletes
People from Talcahuano
Players of American football from Miami
Power forwards (basketball)
Sportspeople from the Miami metropolitan area
Sportspeople from Santiago
Tulane Green Wave men's basketball players
Washington Football Team players